Medang Island (Indonesian: Pulau Medang) is an island off the north coast of Sumbawa, west of Moyo Island, in the Flores Sea.  It is actually composed of two islands, Medang Besar and Medang Kecil (big and small).  There are coral reefs in this area, with sharks and giant sponges.

Notes

See also
 List of islands of Indonesia

Lesser Sunda Islands
Uninhabited islands of Indonesia